Udea washingtonalis, the Washington udea moth, is a moth in the family Crambidae. It was described by Augustus Radcliffe Grote in 1882. It is found in North America, where it has been recorded from Alaska, British Columbia, California, Montana and Washington.

The wingspan is about 21 mm. The forewings are white with a dark brown band from the middle of the costa halfway to the inner margin. The antemedial and postmedial lines are broken and indistinct and there are black spots along the outer margin and the distal half of the costa. There is also pale yellowish shading in the median area. The hindwings are white with a diffuse yellowish terminal band and black dots along the outer margin. Adults are on wing from May to August.

Subspecies
Udea washingtonalis washingtonalis (Washington)
Udea washingtonalis hollandi Munroe, 1966 (British Columbia, Montana)
Udea washingtonalis nomensis Munroe, 1966 (Alaska)
Udea washingtonalis pribilofensis Munroe, 1966 (Alaska: Pribilof Islands)

References

washingtonalis
Moths of North America
Fauna of the California chaparral and woodlands
Fauna of the Northwestern United States
Moths described in 1882
Taxa named by Augustus Radcliffe Grote